Puxin Biogas Digester or Puxin Biogas Plant is product of Shenzhen Puxin Science & Technology Co. Ltd. based in Shenzhen, People's Republic of China. The company was founded in November 2002. Its business is new energy and environmental protection.

Activities
The company's main business is:
 Design and build large and medium-sized biogas projects.
 Develop, manufacture and sell products needed to build family-size biogas system.
 Develop, manufacture and sell new style small size biogas digesters.

Accomplishments

 United Nations' 2006 BlueSky Award 
 23 years development of patented technology; the main inventor has PhD from McGill University, Canada
 Products sold to over 41 countries

Examples 
Puxin biogas digesters built in Kenya.

Tiwi, Kenya
TN P/2 Biogas System at Kenya Bixa Ltd, Tiwi, Kenya 
2-stage-biogas-system consisting of:
 six 20 cubic meter Puxin biogas digester 
 one 26 cubic meter overflow pit 
 six hydrolysis pits 
 two gas bags for storage of biogas 98 cubic meters and 36 cubic meters 
Designed for a daily feedstock of 10 tons of bio waste (seeds, chicken and slaughterhouse waste). With daily 2 tons of annatto seeds, the 6 digesters produce daily about 180 cubic meters of biogas. Biogas is used to run a steam boiler, run dryers. It can also burn diesel and firewood.

Bamburi, Mombasa
TN P/2 Biogas System at Mombasa Go-Kart, Bamburi, Mombasa 
2-stage-biogas-system consisting of:
 one 12 cubic meter Puxin biogas digester 
 three 1 cubic meter hydrolysis pits 
Daily feedstock: 70 – 100 kg kitchen waste. Daily biogas production about 7 cubic meters. The excess biogas that is not consumed is stored in a gas bag. Biogas is used to replace LPG in the restaurant and private houses.

Kikambala, Kenya
TN P/2 Biogas System at Sun 'n' Sand Beach Resort, Kikambala, Kenya 
2-stage-biogas-system consisting of:
 one 14 cubic meter Puxin biogas digester 
 two 4 cubic meter hydrolysis pits.
Designed for a daily feedstock of 400 kg of bio waste (kitchen and garden). Biogas is used to replace LPG and charcoal in the staff canteen.

References

External links 
 Puxin Biogas website
 Puxin Canada agent website
 Puxin Kenya agent website
 Puxin Chile agent website
 Puxin South Africa agent website

Renewable energy companies of China